Soviet–Lithuanian Treaty can refer to three treaties between the Soviet Union and Lithuania:

 Soviet–Lithuanian Peace Treaty of 1920
 Soviet–Lithuanian Non-Aggression Pact of 1926
 Soviet–Lithuanian Mutual Assistance Treaty of 1939